Iotyrris olangoensis is a species of sea snail, a marine gastropod mollusk in the family Turridae, the turrids.

Description
The length of the shell varies between 30 mm and 45 mm.

Distribution
This marine species occurs off the Philippines and Japan.

References

External links

 Abdelkrim, J.; Aznar-Cormano, L.; Buge, B.; Fedosov, A.; Kantor, Y.; Zaharias, P.; Puillandre, N. (2018). Delimiting species of marine gastropods (Turridae, Conoidea) using RAD sequencing in an integrative taxonomy framework. Molecular Ecology. 27(22): 4591-4611
 MNHN, Paris: specimen

olangoensis